Kahn-e Hoseyn-e Pain (also Romanized as Kahn-e Ḩoseyn-e Pā’īn; also known as Kahn-e Ḩoseyn and Kahn-e Ḩoseynābād) is a village in Zaboli Rural District, in the Central District of Mehrestan County, Sistan and Baluchestan Province, Iran. At the 2006 census, its population was 265, in 57 families.

References 

Populated places in Mehrestan County